John Young Bown (December 30, 1821 – September 26, 1890) was a physician and Canadian political figure. He was a member of the House of Commons of Canada from 1867 to 1872.

He was born in Dorsetshire, England, in 1821. He studied at the University of St Andrews and received a degree in medicine. He was a member of the Royal College of Surgeons of England. Bown set up practice in Brantford, Ontario. He married Rebecca Campbell.

He was elected to the 7th Parliament of the Province of Canada representing East Brant in 1861 and was re-elected in 1863. He represented Brant North as a Liberal-Conservative member in the 1st Canadian Parliament.

He died in Brantford in 1890.

References 

1821 births
1890 deaths
English emigrants to pre-Confederation Ontario
Conservative Party of Canada (1867–1942) MPs
Members of the House of Commons of Canada from Ontario
Members of the Legislative Assembly of the Province of Canada from Canada West
Politicians from Dorset
Politicians from Brantford
Alumni of the University of St Andrews
Immigrants to Upper Canada